KUFM may refer to:

 KUFM-TV, a television station (channel 11 analog/27 digital) licensed to Missoula, Montana, United States, simulcasting KUSM
 KUFM (FM), a radio station (89.1 FM) licensed to Missoula, Montana, United States